Henry Morley (1852 – 16 August 1924) was an English first-class cricketer active 1884 who played for Nottinghamshire. He was born and died in Edwinstowe.

References

1852 births
1924 deaths
English cricketers
Nottinghamshire cricketers